Rolf Ingvar Nerlöv (January 4, 1940 – June 27, 2015) was a Swedish sculptor, painter and stonemason. He was born in Malmö, in Southern Sweden. Nerlöv's intense interest in art began at a very early age. When he was 11, he became the apprentice of renowned sculptor Thure Thörn and was tutored by him until he was around 19 years old. He was educated in Copenhagen, at the Royal Danish Academy of Fine Arts 1960 - 1964, under Gottfred Eickhoff.

Nerlöv's artistic work was mostly focused on post-impressionist sculpture - portraiture, human figures, animal figures - and poignant scenes from human life, such as the Church Yard and Lonesome. During the 1990s, he also started painting oil pastels, again focusing on post-impressionism. He had art exhibitions for example at Galerie Holm, Galleri Loftet, Galleri Ströget, Wanås Castle and Sculpture Park, Galleri Konstnärscentrum in Malmö, and Galleri Måsen in Småland. He has made a portrait of Swedish actress Gudrun Brost.

Nerlöv was also a skilled stonemason. He worked at cemeteries with very large stones that were not to be moved, engraving them by hand with chisel and hammer. He also did several assignments for The City of Malmö, for example at Malmö Museum, Jörgen Kocks hus and Gustav Adolfs torg (Gustav Adolf's Square).

Rolf Nerlöv was awarded the City of Malmö Cultural Award in 1983.

References

Notes 
 City of Malmö Cultural Awards 1980 - 1989

Sources 
 Art review in Skånska Dagbladet by Jean Bolinder  
 Artists encyclopedia Konstnärslexikonett Amanda
 Portrait of actress Gudrun Brost

External links 
 Rolf Nerlöv sculptures - a selection
 Rolf Nerlöv oil pastel paintings - a selection

Swedish male sculptors
Swedish male painters
20th-century Swedish sculptors
20th-century Swedish painters
1940 births
2015 deaths
20th-century Swedish male artists